Herschel Bernardi (October 30, 1923 – May 9, 1986) was an American actor and singer. He is best known for his supporting role in the drama television series Peter Gunn (1958–1961) and his leading role in the comedy television series Arnie (1970–1972). The two series earned him a Primetime Emmy Award nomination and two consecutive Golden Globe Award nominations.

On stage, Bernardi appeared in many Broadway musicals. He was nominated for two Tony Awards for his performances in the original production of Zorba and the 1981 revival of Fiddler on the Roof.

Biography
Born in New York City, Herschel Bernardi was the youngest son of Berel and Helen Bernardi, both Jewish. He was appearing on the stages of 2nd Avenue with his acting family before he could talk. In the 1930s, Bernardi appeared in the Yiddish films of Edgar G. Ulmer and was later among those actors who made the transition from Yiddish language films to English language films. Herschel was the brother of Jack Bernardi (who played Harvey Pulp in It's a Bikini World). 

Bernardi is known for his starring roles on Broadway, including Tevye in Fiddler on the Roof, Zorba, and Bajour. He also appeared in many television programs, including Harbor Command and The Eleventh Hour (both with Wendell Corey) and State Trooper with Rod Cameron.

His career as a performer was affected by his being blacklisted for alleged involvement in the Communist Party in the 1950s.

From 1958 to 1961, Bernardi co-starred with Craig Stevens in Blake Edwards's television series Peter Gunn. He received his sole Emmy nomination, for Best Supporting Actor (Continuing Character) in a Dramatic Series - 1959, for his portrayal of Lieutenant Jacoby.

In 1961 Bernardi guest-starred in a Bonanza episode ("The Smiler") as Clarence Bolling, the vengeful brother of a murdered man.

In 1963 he was cast as Mr. Otis, a teacher who mostly ignores his students, in the episode "I Don't Even Live Here" of the NBC education drama series Mr. Novak starring James Franciscus.

Bernardi starred in the CBS sitcom Arnie (1970-1972). He starred for two years as someone plucked from the loading dock of a flange company to become an executive. He was nominated for Golden Globe Awards for Best Performance by an Actor in a Television Series - Musical or Comedy in 1971 and 1972.

He voiced Woodhead the rocking horse in Filmation's Journey Back to Oz. He also provided the Cowardly Lion's singing voice while Milton Berle provided the character's speaking voice. He also appeared as Joe Vitelli in the 1977 TV miniseries Seventh Avenue.

In Hail to the Chief (1985), a comedy on ABC, Bernardi played Helmut Luger.

Bernardi was in several notable films, including Murder by Contract (1958); A Cold Wind in August (1961); The George Raft Story (1961); Irma La Douce (1963); Love with the Proper Stranger (1963); No Deposit, No Return (1976); and The Front (1976), a film about blacklisting in the entertainment industry.  Bernardi was the victim of blacklisting during the 1950s, as were several other performers and the screenwriter and director on that film. Bernardi also narrated and emceed The Golden Age of Second Avenue, a 1969 film documentary about the Yiddish theatre movement on New York's Lower East Side of the early-to-mid 20th century (where Bernardi had launched his acting career).

Bernardi was a noted voiceover artist and narrator with hundreds of films, commercials and cartoons to his credit and was the original voice of StarKist Tuna animated character "Charlie the Tuna" as well as the original voice of the Jolly Green Giant and was also the narrator of a long-running Tootsie Pop commercial, saying, "How many licks does it take to get to the Tootsie Roll center of a Tootsie Pop? The world may never know."

Herschel Bernardi also had two minor record hits, 1967's "If I Were a Rich Man", reflecting his success as Tevye, and 1971's "Pencil Marks on the Wall".

In 1961, the Vanguard Recording Society issued "Chocolate Covered Matzohs", recorded 'live' in front of an audience at the Valley Cities Jewish Community Center of Los Angeles, California, which was a collection of sentimental and wryly humorous tales in Yiddish and English of Jewish immigration into the U.S. at the turn of the 20th century and also featured some songs.

Death
Bernardi died in his sleep of a heart attack in Los Angeles, California, on May 9, 1986, at age 62.  Bernardi is buried at Mount Sinai Memorial Park Cemetery in Los Angeles, California.

Filmography

Film

Television

Commercials

References

External links

 
 
 
 
 
 
 Discography at SonyBMG Masterworks

1923 births
1986 deaths
American male film actors
American male musical theatre actors
American male television actors
American male voice actors
Jewish American male actors
American male radio actors
American male stage actors
Yiddish theatre performers
Burials at Mount Sinai Memorial Park Cemetery
Male actors from Los Angeles
20th-century American male actors
20th-century American singers
20th-century American male singers
20th-century American Jews
Hanna-Barbera people
Male actors from New York City